The 1975 Copa Interamericana was the 5th. edition of the Copa Interamericana. The final was contested by Argentine Club Atlético Independiente (champion of 1975 Copa Libertadores) and Mexican team Atlético Español (winner of 1975 CONCACAF Champions' Cup). The final was played under a two-leg format in August 1976. Both matches were held in Estadio Olímpico, Caracas, Venezuela.

In the first leg, both teams tied 2–2, while the second leg was also a tie, 0–0. As both teams equaled in points and goal difference, a penalty shoot-out was carried out to decide a champion. Independiente won 4–2 on penalties, therefore the Argentine team won their third and consecutive Interamericana trophy.

Qualified teams

Venue

Both games were held in Estadio Olímpico in the city of Caracas, Venezuela, after an agreement between both clubs. The matches were attended by a high number of fans due to the interest of Venezuelan people to see Independiente.

The stadium was a multi-use purpose venue, belonging to the Central University of Venezuela, designed by architect Carlos Raúl Villanueva, had been opened in 1951 as part of the creation of University City of Caracas, that would be declared a "World Heritage Site" by UNESCO in 2000. The stadium was inaugurated in the 1951 Bolivarian Games. The stadium also hosted matches of the Small Club World Cup between 1952 and 1963.

Match details

First Leg

Second Leg

References

Copa Interamericana
i
i
i
i